Xoliswa Sithole (born 31 December 1968) is a South African actress and documentary filmmaker, raised in Zimbabwe. she won a BAFTA in 2004 for her documentary Orphans Of Nkandla. She won a Peabody Award in 2010 and a BAFTA in 2011 for her documentary Zimbabwe's Forgotten Children.

Early life
Xoliswa Sithole was born in South Africa and raised in Zimbabwe after 1970. Her mother died from complications related to HIV/AIDS in 1995. Her stepfather's cousin, Ndabaningi Sithole, was a founder of the Zimbabwe African National Union (ZANU), and assassinated lawyer and politician Edison Sithole (1935–1975) was her cousin. She earned a degree in English from the University of Zimbabwe in 1987.

Career
As a documentary filmmaker, Xoliswa Sithole created and starred in Shouting Silent (2002, 2011), a film about her own family's experience with HIV/AIDS, and directed Zimbabwe's Forgotten Children (2010). Zimbabwe's Forgotten Children won a Peabody Award in 2010. She was associate producer on The Orphans of Nkandla (2004), making Sithole the first South African woman to win a BAFTA award. Her films have regularly appeared on the programs at the African Film Festival New York, and other international film festivals. In 1999 she was South Africa's ambassador at the Cannes Film Festival.

Sithole produced South Africa from Triumph to Transition and Mandela for CNN Prime Time, and the series Real Lives for South African television.  Other film and television projects by Sithole include Child of the Revolution (2005–2015), The First South African, Return to Zimbabwe, Martine and Thandeka (2009), South Africa's Lost Girls, and The Fall (2016). "I have only one desire in life," she told interviewer Audrey McCluskey, "Only one – to create images that change the world."

Acting appearances by Sithole include roles in the films Cry Freedom (1987), Mandela (1987, television), Fools, and Chikin Biznis.

References

External links
 
 
 Xoliswa Sithole fact sheet at Nayanaya Pictures website.
 Xoliswa Sithole, There is a God in Everybody, interview video.
 Xoliswa Sithole speaks about how dreaming can set you free, video (August 5, 2014).

South African film actresses
University of Zimbabwe alumni
1967 births
Living people
South African television actresses
20th-century South African actresses
South African women film directors
South African documentary film directors
Peabody Award winners
Women documentary filmmakers